The Advisory Council on Historic Preservation (ACHP), an independent federal agency, is charged with the mission to promote the preservation of the nation's diverse historic resources. The ACHP advises the President and Congress on national historic preservation policy and also provides a public forum for stakeholders and the public to influence federal agency decisions regarding federal projects and programs that affect historic properties. The ACHP promotes the importance of historic preservation to foster an understanding of the nation's heritage and the contribution that historic preservation can make to contemporary communities, along with their economic and social well-being.

The ACHP was created by the National Historic Preservation Act (NHPA) of 1966, which sets forth most of the ACHP's duties and authorities. Passage of the NHPA was a watershed event that launched a transformation of the federal government from an agent of indifference—frequently responsible for the needless loss of historic resources—to a facilitator, an agent of thoughtful change, and a responsible steward of historic properties for future generations.

The ACHP, created by the NHPA, is the only federal agency whose sole mission is promoting the preservation of the nation's diverse historic resources.

In keeping with these concepts, the ACHP is responsible for overseeing the federal historic preservation review process established by Section 106 of the NHPA (now codified as 54 U.S.C. 306108). Section 106 requires federal agencies to consider the effects of federal projects on historic properties and to provide the ACHP an opportunity to weigh in on project impacts.

Based on authority granted by the NHPA, the ACHP has issued regulations (36 CFR Part 800) that spell out how agencies should meet their Section 106 responsibilities efficiently and effectively while giving due consideration to the historic places that communities value. Administering application of the Section 106 review process is a major ACHP responsibility.

Mission 
In January 2011, ACHP membership adopted the following Mission Statement:

The Advisory Council on Historic Preservation promotes the preservation, enhancement, and sustainable use of our nation's diverse historic resources, and advises the President and the Congress on national historic preservation policy.

Membership 
The ACHP's 24 statutorily designated members, including the chairman who heads the agency, address policy issues, direct program initiatives, and make recommendations regarding historic preservation to the President, Congress, and heads of other federal agencies. Members meet several times per year to conduct business. ACHP members are from various federal agencies, local and state government, the public, and historic preservation organizations.
 Four members of the general public and four historic preservation experts are appointed by the President, including the chairman and vice chairman.
 A member of an Indian tribe or Native Hawaiian organization, a governor, and a mayor are appointed by the President.
 Two federal agency heads and the Architect of the Capitol are permanent members of ACHP.
 Seven federal agency heads are designated by the President to terms on ACHP.
 Ex-officio representatives of national preservation organizations round out ACHP's membership.

Chairman
In March 2018, Aimee Jorjani was nominated by President Donald Trump as the first full-time chairman of the Advisory Council on Historic Preservation (ACHP), earning Senate confirmation in June 2019. Jorjani has nearly 20 years of experience in the fields of government and cultural resources from a variety of perspectives including both executive and legislative branches, as well as the non-profit sector. Her career began on Capitol Hill working as a legislative aide to Rep. Paul Ryan (R-WI). She later moved to the U.S. Department of the Interior (DOI) and had several positions, including serving as the Deputy Secretary's Special Assistant for Historic Preservation. A native of Milwaukee, Wisconsin, Ms. Jorjani is a graduate of Northern Michigan University and Goucher College, with a Masters in Historic Preservation. Jorjani's term of office was due to end on June 10, 2021. President Joe Biden asked for Jorjani's resignation on February 5, 2021.

President Joe Biden nominated Sara Bronin as the next chair of the Advisory Council on Historic Preservation on June 24, 2021. Bronin was confirmed by the Senate on 22 December, 2022.

List of chairmen of the Advisory Council on Historic Preservation

This is an incomplete list of chairmen since 1966. Until 2019, all chairmen were appointed directly by the president. From 2018 the chairman has been nominated by the president and confirmed with the advise and consent of the Senate:

Activities
The ACHP's major program offices are reflected in its organizational structure.

The Office of Federal Agency Programs participates in Section 106 reviews, develops and implements program improvement initiatives, provides technical assistance and guidance for Section 106 users, and works to improve federal agency and stakeholder understanding of Section 106. It also oversees implementation of Section 3 of Executive Order 13287, "Preserve America," and develops and administers the ACHP's training program, including delivery of classroom courses, webinars, and e-learning.

The Office of Native American Affairs advises the ACHP leadership and staff on policy and program matters related to Native American issues, and offers technical assistance and outreach for tribal and Native Hawaiian Organization consultation under the Section 106 review process.

The Office of Preservation Initiatives (OPI) analyzes legislation, develops policy recommendations, oversees special studies and reports, and implements programs related to national preservation benefits such as community development, economic impacts, sustainability, and tourism. It oversees the Preserve America Program.

The Office of Communications, Education, and Outreach creates and conveys the ACHP's message to partners, stakeholders, and the general public via print and electronic media, meets information requests from citizens and Congress, handles media relations, and manages ACHP outreach, awards and publications.

A professional staff, which supports ACHP's daily operations, is headquartered in Washington, D.C.

Terms 
The ACHP members who are the heads of other Federal agencies serve on the ACHP as long as they hold their head of agency positions. The president of the National Conference of State Historic Preservation Officers, the Chairman of the National Trust for Historic Preservation, and the Architect of the Capitol are ex officio members of the ACHP, and therefore serve on the ACHP as long as they hold their mentioned positions. Mayors and governors serve for terms that last as long as they are serving in an elected capacity as mayor or governor but no longer than four years. The citizen (including the chairman), expert, and Indian tribe/Native Hawaiian organization members of the ACHP all serve four year terms.

References

External links
 

1966 establishments in the United States
Historic preservation organizations in the United States
United States federal boards, commissions, and committees
National Register of Historic Places
Independent agencies of the United States government